Atlanta Tech Village is a technology incubator complex located in the Buckhead community of Atlanta, Georgia.

History
Atlanta Tech Village was founded by David Cummings in 2012 as a small business incubator. Within its first year the incubator had 180 tenant companies.

Incubator
The Village is now the fourth largest tech hub in the US, housing about 300 companies in 2018, and partners with larger corporations like Turner, Google, Amazon, Microsoft and Coca-Cola to form relationships between startups and larger establishments. Past companies have included Yik Yak, BitPay, and IO Education. The Village also houses international offshoots from foreign tech companies alongside its American startups.  The company has about 1000 entrepreneurs working complex, which are connected to angel investors and funding sources, in addition to business mentors. The Village also has a pre-accelerator program that works with minorities and women in the early stages of their business development.

Space
In addition to its investments, Atlanta Tech Village rents both office space and individual desks to technology companies. The complex is 103,000 square feet in total.

References

2012 establishments in Georgia (U.S. state)
Business incubators of the United States
Companies based in Atlanta